Mid-Atlantic or Mid Atlantic can refer to:
The middle of the Atlantic Ocean
Mid-Atlantic English, a mix between British English and American English
Mid-Atlantic Region (Little League World Series), one of the United States geographic divisions of the Little League World Series
Mid-Atlantic Ridge, an underwater mountain range in the Atlantic Ocean separating two tectonic plates
Mid-Atlantic (United States), a geographic region of the United States
Mid-Atlantic Athletic Conference, an athletic league in the United States
Mid-Atlantic Championship Wrestling, brand name for wrestling events promoted by Jim Crockett Promotions